Madhuca vulpina is a tree in the family Sapotaceae. The specific epithet vulpina means "fox-like", referring to the colour of the indumentum.

Description
The bark is brown. Inflorescences bear up to three flowers.

Distribution and habitat
Madhuca vulpina is endemic to Borneo, where it is confined to Sarawak. Its habitat is mixed dipterocarp and kerangas forests to  altitude.

Conservation
Madhuca vulpina has been assessed as critically endangered on the IUCN Red List. The species is threatened by logging and conversion of land for palm oil plantations.

References

vulpina
Endemic flora of Borneo
Plants described in 2001